Mount Tolley is a peak, 1,030 m, standing 2 nautical miles (3.7 km) south of Mount Swartley in the Allegheny Mountains of the Ford Ranges, Marie Byrd Land. The peak was discovered on aerial flights from West Base of the United States Antarctic Service (USAS) (1939–41), and was named for president William P. Tolley of Allegheny College, Pennsylvania.

References

Ford Ranges